is a Japanese screenwriter and novelist.

Biography 
Yumoto was born in Tokyo and graduated from Tokyo College of Music. She began writing scripts for opera and became a writer for television and radio. Her debut children's novel  "The Friends"  (1992)  received the Newcomer Award from the Japan Children's Literature Association and the Boston Globe–Horn Book Awards in 1999. It was adapted to a movie in 1994, directed by Shinji Sōmai. Kishibe no Tabi (Journey to the Shore),  another of her books, was adapted to a film; directed by Kiyoshi Kurosawa, it won the Un Certain Regard  award at the 2015 Cannes Festival.

Selected works 
 1992- The Friends 
 1997- The Letters (
 2008- The Bear and the Wildcat 
 2010- Kisishibe no Tabi

References 

1959 births
Living people
Japanese children's writers
Japanese women children's writers
20th-century Japanese writers
21st-century Japanese writers
20th-century Japanese women writers
21st-century Japanese women writers
Japanese screenwriters